Bachi is a 2000 Indian Telugu-language comedy film, produced by Chanti Addala under the Srinivasa Arts banner and directed by Puri Jagannadh. It stars Jagapathi Babu, Neelambari and music composed by Chakri. This is the debut film of Chakri as music director.

Plot
The film begins with a cop Bhaskar Chenmai / Bachi the special branch. He falls for a beautiful ingénue Venkatalakshmi. Suddenly, a piece of spectacular news rocks the country that a hick Tatineni Koteswara Rao wins 50 crores in the Paris lottery. Accordingly, various gangsters and burglars behind him acquire the ticket. Since he has severe life threats Bachi is appointed as his chief security officer. Plus, a fat cat Satyambabu accounts him with all facilities to snatch the ticket. One day, Bachi receives a courier in which a boy Habibi is delivered from Dubai. He proclaims him as his father by the affirmation of his mother Parvati. Therefrom, he makes his life forlorn and Bachi whacks to dispose of him but fails. In addition, a rift is created in his love. However, as time goes by Bachi gets affectionate toward Habibi. Now he takes a stab to unravel when he is cognizant that another Bachi a tomcat had resided at his residence ahead before. Parallelly, Parvati plays hides & seek game with him, and being unbeknownst he protects her from endangerment. Thus, he strives hard to nab both Parvati & Bachi-2. Ultimately, he cracks the whereabouts of Bachi-2 and ascertains that he doesn't have any bearing with Habibi.

Besides, sundry elite groups, officials, and respectable in society bestows high amounts to Koteswara Rao on assurance of Satyambabu. One fine morning absconds announcing the lottery is a back fence talk, which leaves Satyambabu bankrupt. The incident takes aback and the entire department is on Koteswara Rao's hunt. Afterward, a social welfare organization arrives to retrieve Habibi as he is wrongly delivered. However, Bachi bars them as they are strongly correlated. Eventually, via them, he traces Parvati lying in an ailing position in a hospital. At that point, surprisingly, she states herself as the sibling of Venkatalakshmi who is deceived by an impostor. Further, she professes, that the reason behind nearing her boy to Bachi is that he will fasten him in the future. Here Bachi words Parvati to rear Habibi as his own and she happily leaves her breath. Meanwhile, Koteswara Rao ruses to change his face through cosmetic surgery Venkatalakshmi spots it and informs Bachi. Immediately, he rides but Koteswara Rao flees using Habibi as a shield. Bachi backs him when as a flabbergast, it is divulged the one who hoodwinked Parvati is Koteswara Rao only and Habibi is his son. Listening to it, he reforms requests Bachi to maintain secrecy, and let Habibi stay as his son only. At last, Koteswara Rao surrenders before the judiciary. Finally, the movie ends on a happy note with the marriage of Bachi & Venkatalakshmi.

Cast

 Jagapathi Babu as Bhaskar Chimai / Baachi
 Neelambari as Venkatalakshmi
 Prakash Raj as Tatineni Koteswara Rao
 Kota Srinivasa Rao as Satyambabu
 Ali
 Dharmavarapu Subramanyam as Special Branch Chief Gokarnam
 AVS as Quarter Narayana
 Babloo Prithiveeraj as Baachi 2
 Chinna as S.I.
 Raghu Kunche as Raghu
 Chitti Babu as Koyadora
 Uttej as Courier Boy
 Pruthviraj 
 Gautam Raju
 Kadambari Kiran as Beggar
 Tirupati Prakash
 Ananth as Satyambabu's P.A.
 Krishna Chaitanya
 Junior Relangi as Constable
 Vidya as Jayamalini
 Yamuna as Parvathi
 Kalpana Rai
 Master Sajja Teja as Habibi

Soundtrack

Music composed by Chakri. Music released on HMV Audio Company.

References

External links

2000 films
Indian action films
2000s Telugu-language films
Films directed by Puri Jagannadh
Films scored by Chakri
2000 action films